Constraint Language in XML (CLiX) used to constrain the content of XML documents. It is based on first order logic and XPath, and its purpose is to enable the specification of constraints on the structure and content of XML documents. CLiX constraints can be used both to constraint documents internally and to execute inter-document checks between a number of documents. 

The goal of CLiX is to enable users and developers to express business properties and complex constraints that cannot be handled in traditional schema languages, and to automate checks that would otherwise have to be hard-coded.

References 

XML markup languages